Paula Jarzabkowski  is a financial researcher and Professor of Strategic Management at the Bayes Business School, University of London.

Biography
Jarzabkowski worked as the Professor of Strategic Management at Aston Business School from 2007 to 2013. She joined the University of London in 2016. Jarzabkowski was elected a Fellow of the British Academy in 2020.

Select publications
Jarzabkowski, P., Kavas, M., Krull, E. 2021. "It’s Practice. But is it Strategy? Reinvigorating strategy-as-practice by rethinking consequentiality", Organization Theory. 
Jarzabkowski, P., Lê, J., Balogun, J. 2019. "The Social Practice of Coevolving Strategy and Structure to Realize Mandated Radical Change", Academy of Management Journal 62 (3). 
Bednarek, R., Chalkias, K., and Jarzabkowski, P. 2019 "Managing Risk as a Duality of Harm and Benefit: A Study of Organizational Risk Objects in the Global Insurance Industry", British Journal of Management 32 (1), 235–254.

References

Living people
Fellows of the British Academy
Academics of the University of London
Academics of Aston University
Year of birth missing (living people)